Narina Sokolova is a Russian born American animation artist. She has won two Primetime Emmy Award for Outstanding Individual Achievement in Animation, and won Annie Award for Outstanding Individual Achievement in Animation. She is a member of The Animation Guild, I.A.T.S.E. Local 839.

Selected filmography

Awards and nominations

References

External links
 
 

Living people
American animators
Year of birth missing (living people)